Yvonne, Prinzessin von Burgund (Yvonne, Princess of Burgundy) is an opera in four acts composed by Boris Blacher to a German-language libretto by the composer based on Witold Gombrowicz's 1935 Polish play  (Yvonne, Burgundy Princess). Composed in 1972, it was Blacher's last opera. It premiered on 15 September 1973 at the Opernhaus Wuppertal, directed by Kurt Horres.

The story is set in the royal court of an imaginary country and combines elements of tragic farce, fantasy, and moral criticism. The title role is portrayed by a mute dancer. Pina Bausch danced the title role at the Wuppertal premiere, one of her last performances before establishing her dance company Tanztheater Wuppertal.

Gombrowicz's Iwona, księżniczka Burgunda was published in 1935 but did not receive its first performance until 1957 when it premiered in Warsaw. It has since served as the basis for four operas, of which Blacher's was the first. The others are the chamber opera Yvonne by Ulrich Wagner (b. 1967) with a German libretto, first performed in Krefeld in 1998; Iwona, księżniczka Burgunda by Zygmunt Krauze with a Polish libretto, first performed in Paris in 2004; and Yvonne, Princesse de Bourgogne by Philippe Boesmans with a French libretto, first performed at the Paris Opera in 2009.

Roles

Synopsis 

The action is set at an imaginary court at no defined time. Prince Philipp, bored by the court and its endless ceremonies, chooses Yvonne, an ugly and mute girl, as his fiancée. His parents, Queen Margarete and King Ignatz, are appalled at the engagement and the prince's choice is mocked by the courtiers. Yvonne's refusal to speak, despite repeated attempts to make her break her silence, causes even more provocation. As tension at the court mounts, King Ignatz and the Chamberlain reveal themselves to be murderers, and the courtly ceremonies become a farce. In the end, Yvonne, still silent, is killed during a banquet in her honour.

See also
 Yvonne, princesse de Bourgogne, opera by Philippe Boesmans and Luc Bondy

References

Operas by Boris Blacher
1973 operas
German-language operas
Operas based on plays
Operas